Brandon Michael Knight (born October 1, 1975 in Oxnard, California) is a retired American professional baseball player and current pitching coach. A right-handed pitcher, Knight played Major League Baseball for the New York Yankees and the New York Mets, Nippon Professional Baseball for the Fukuoka Daiei Hawks and the Hokkaido Nippon Ham Fighters, and in the KBO League for the Nexen Heroes. He is the current pitching coach for the Kiwoom Heroes of the KBO.

Professional

American baseball 

Nippon Professional Baseball 
From –, Knight played for Nippon Professional Baseball (NPB) in Japan. He spent two years in Fukuoka, Japan playing for the Fukuoka Daiei Hawks and one year in Sapporo, Japan playing for the Nippon Ham Fighters.

Return to American baseball 
Upon returning to the United States, Knight signed and played in the Pittsburgh Pirates organization for the  season.

In , Knight signed with the Somerset Patriots of the Atlantic League. Brett Jodie, the former Yankee pitcher, now the Patriots pitching coach noticed that Knight's release point was too high. After Knight modified his release point, his command and velocity improved. The Mets decided to purchase his contract and signed him to their Triple-A team (New Orleans Zephyrs) in New Orleans, Louisiana.

While pitching for the New Orleans Zephyrs, Knight was selected to play for the U.S. Olympic team at the 2008 Summer Olympics in Beijing, China.  Knight pitched in two baseball games at the Olympics, earning one win.  He earned a bronze medal as part of the U.S. team.

Knight made his first career major league start in Shea Stadium for the New York Mets on July 26, against the St. Louis Cardinals. He allowed four runs in the first inning, but settled down, and held the Cardinals scoreless through the next four innings. Though he left the game with the Mets leading 5-4, the bullpen was unable to hold the lead and Knight was denied his first major league win. He was designated for assignment the following day, so that he could remain on the Olympic Roster.  He was recalled to the Mets when rosters expanded in September, and he earned his first MLB win later in the year.

KBO League 
On July 24, 2009, the New York Mets released Knight so that he could sign with the Samsung Lions in South Korea. On August 4, 2010, he was released from Samsung Lions due to an injury.

Knight played with the Nexen Heroes Baseball Club of Seoul, South Korea from 2011 to 2014. In 2012 he led the KBO in ERA with 2.20 and innings pitched with 208-2/3, and was second in wins with 16. His career record in Korea was 48 wins and 38 losses with an ERA of 3.84.

Since his retirement in 2015, Knight has been coaching within the Heroes organization. He is the franchise's current pitching coach.

Personal
Knight was born in Oxnard, California. He was raised in Ventura, California, and continues to reside there with his wife Brooke and children.

References

External links 

 Career statistics and player information from Korea Baseball Organization

Major League Baseball pitchers
Baseball players from California
American expatriate baseball players in Japan
Fukuoka Daiei Hawks players
Hokkaido Nippon-Ham Fighters players
Gulf Coast Rangers players
Charleston RiverDogs players
Hudson Valley Renegades players
Tulsa Drillers players
Oklahoma RedHawks players
Columbus Clippers players
Altoona Curve players
Somerset Patriots players
New Orleans Zephyrs players
New York Yankees players
New York Mets players
Ventura Pirates baseball players
KBO League pitchers
American expatriate baseball players in South Korea
Samsung Lions players
Kiwoom Heroes players
Baseball players at the 2008 Summer Olympics
Olympic bronze medalists for the United States in baseball
Buffalo Bisons (minor league) players
Sportspeople from Oxnard, California
1975 births
Living people
Medalists at the 2008 Summer Olympics
People from Ventura, California
Sportspeople from Ventura County, California